Brocca was a nobleman from Transdanubia in the Kingdom of Hungary, who was appointed Judge royal by Anti-king Stephen IV of Hungary in 1163. He lost his office when his king suffered a decisive defeat at Székesfehérvár on 19 June 1163 against Stephen III of Hungary.

Brocca was a prominent member of the Baracska clan which originated from Bojta, a Cuman military commander and lord, however the name itself derived from Brocca. Thus the name of village Baracska is also named after Brocca, according to historian János Karácsonyi.

References

Sources
 Makk, Ferenc (1989). The Árpáds and the Comneni: Political Relations between Hungary and Byzantium in the 12th century (Translated by György Novák). Akadémiai Kiadó. .
  Zsoldos, Attila (2011). Magyarország világi archontológiája, 1000–1301 ("Secular Archontology of Hungary, 1000–1301"). História, MTA Történettudományi Intézete. Budapest. 

Judges royal
12th-century Hungarian people